The Emergency System for Advance Registration of Volunteer Health Professionals (ESAR-VHP) is a United States federal program to establish and implement guidelines and standards for the registration, credentialing, and deployment of medical professionals in the event of a large scale national emergency. The program is administered under the Assistant Secretary for Preparedness & Response (ASPR) within the Office of Public Health Emergency Preparedness of the United States Department of Health and Human Services. The ESAR-VHP standards are mandated to American states and territories, enabling an enhanced national interstate and intrastate system for using and sharing medical professionals.

History
After complications arose in the use of medical volunteers following 9/11, United States Congress authorized the Health Resources and Services Administration (HRSA) to develop ESAR-VHP. In December, 2006, the Pandemic and All-Hazards Preparedness Act reassigned responsibility for ESAR-VHP to the Assistant Secretary for Preparedness and Response (ASPR) of the U.S. Department of Health and Human Services.  Section 203 of the Pandemic and All-Hazards Preparedness Reauthorization Act of 2013 (H.R. 307; 113th Congress) reauthorized the ESAR-VHP for Fiscal years 2014–2018.

See also
 Emergency management
 Incident Command System
 National Response Plan
 Medical Reserve Corps

Notes/References

External links
 Office of the Assistant Secretary for Preparedness and Response

United States Department of Health and Human Services